The 2002 Major League Soccer SuperDraft was held on February 10, 2002 in Lake Buena Vista, Florida.

One month earlier, MLS had contracted two clubs: Tampa Bay Mutiny and Miami Fusion. In conjunction with the contraction, the league conducted both an allocation draft and a dispersal draft in which the top 2002 SuperDraft picks of Tampa Bay and Miami, as well as players from those clubs, were made available to remaining MLS clubs.

Allocation draft
MLS distributed the players of the Miami Fusion and the Tampa Bay Mutiny to the rest of the league via an allocation draft that took place on January 11, 2002, where teams with excess allocations were allowed to select from their players; the participants and the selection order for the draft were announced three days before the draft was conducted.

Trades

Dispersal draft
Players who were not selected in the allocation draft were automatically assigned to the dispersal draft, which was held hours after the allocation draft occurred.

Round 1

Trades

Round 2

Round 3

SuperDraft
Any player whose name is marked with an * was contracted under the Project-40 program.

Round 1

Trades

Round 2

Trades

Round 3

Trades

Round 4

Trades

Round 5

Trades

Round 6

Trades

References 

Major League Soccer drafts
SuperDraft
MLS SuperDraft
Soccer in Florida
Lake Buena Vista, Florida
Events in Florida
MLS SuperDraft
MLS SuperDraft